Cytosolic beta-glucosidase, also known as cytosolic beta-glucosidase-like protein 1, is a beta-glucosidase enzyme that in humans is encoded by the GBA3 gene.

Function 
Cytosolic beta-glucosidase  is a predominantly liver enzyme that efficiently hydrolyzes beta-D-glucoside and beta-D-galactoside, but not any known physiologic beta-glycoside, suggesting that it may be involved in detoxification of plant glycosides. GBA3 also has significant neutral glycosylceramidase activity, suggesting that it may be involved in a non-lysosomal catabolic pathway of glucosylceramide metabolism.

See also
 Closely related enzymes
 GBA: acid β-glucosidase, 
 GBA2: acid β-glucosidase (bile acid), also

References

Further reading

External links 
 PDBe-KB provides an overview of all the structure information available in the PDB for Human Cytosolic beta-glucosidase

EC 3.2.1